James Stuart-Mackenzie PC FRSE FSA (30 October 1718 – 8 April 1800) was a Scottish politician and joint founder of the Royal Society of Edinburgh in 1783. The second son of James Stuart, 2nd Earl of Bute, he served as Member of Parliament for various Scottish constituencies of the Parliament of the United Kingdom from 1742 to 1780. Stuart-Mackenzie was the British Minister at Turin from 1758 to 1761. He was made a Privy Councillor in 1761, and served as Keeper of the Privy Seal of Scotland from 1763 to 1765, and again from the following year until his death in 1800.

Life
Born James Stuart, he was a younger son of James Stuart, 2nd Earl of Bute, and his wife Lady Anne Campbell, daughter of Archibald Campbell, 1st Duke of Argyll. Prime Minister John Stuart, 3rd Earl of Bute, was his elder brother.

He was educated at Eton College 1728 to 1732 then travelled to Europe to study at the University of Leyden where he graduated in 1737.

He inherited the Rosehaugh estates near Avoch in Ross-shire through his paternal grandmother Agnes Mackenzie and assumed the additional surname of Mackenzie. He was returned to Parliament for Buteshire in 1747, a seat he held until 1754, and then represented Ross-shire from 1761 to 1780. In 1761 he was sworn of the Privy Council. In 1763 he became Keeper of the Privy Seal of Scotland until 1765 and then again in 1766 until his death.

In 1752 Hon. James Stewart Mackenzie sold Rosehaugh and bought from Sir Thomas and William Nairn the ecclesiastical lands of Kirkhill in Meigle, which belonged to the Holy Trinity of Dunkeld, and upon the site of the former Castle, which had been used as a grange for the Churchmen, he erected Belmont Castle, at  a cost of £10,000.

He was a very studious man and a great astronomer. A telescope, purportedly specially made for him, is in the Robert Whipple Collection at the University of Cambridge. He was responsible for the building of the observatory on Kinpurnie Hill, then part of his estate. The observatory was designed by Alexander Bryce (1713 - 1786), Minister of Kirknewton and East Calder, but remained incomplete.

He died on 6 April 1800.

Family
Stuart-Mackenzie married his first cousin Lady Elizabeth Campbell, daughter of John Campbell, 2nd Duke of Argyll, in 1749. They had no surviving children. She died in July 1799. Stuart-Mackenzie survived her by less than a year and died in April 1800. According to a decision in 1803 his estates were passed on to his nephew James Stuart-Wortley-Mackenzie.

He was brother-in-law to Robert Bruce, Lord Kennet.

Notes

References 

1710s births
1800 deaths
People educated at Eton College
Leiden University alumni
Scottish astronomers
Fellows of the Royal Society of Edinburgh
Members of the Parliament of Great Britain for Scottish constituencies
British MPs 1741–1747
British MPs 1747–1754
British MPs 1754–1761
British MPs 1761–1768
British MPs 1768–1774
British MPs 1774–1780
Members of the Privy Council of Great Britain
Younger sons of earls
James